Alberta Lee (1860–1928) was an American stage and film actress of the silent era. In 1915, she appeared as Mary Todd Lincoln in The Birth of a Nation.

Selected filmography

 The Birth of a Nation (1915)
 Reggie Mixes In (1916)
 A Sister of Six (1916)
 The Children of the Feud (1916)
 The Little Yank (1917)
 The Fuel of Life (1917)
 An Old-Fashioned Young Man (1917)
 Alias Mary Brown (1918)
 The Painted Lily (1918)
 False Ambition (1918)
 Limousine Life (1918)
 The Man Who Woke Up (1918)
 The Wishing Ring Man (1919)
 The Red Viper (1919)
 Prudence on Broadway (1919)
 The Road to Divorce (1920)
 Rouge and Riches (1920)
 The Butterfly Man (1920)
 The Cheater (1920)
 Live Wires (1921)
 Not Guilty (1921)
 The Light in the Clearing (1921)
 The Magnificent Brute (1921)
 The Little Minister (1922)
 The Fourteenth Lover (1922)
 Nancy from Nowhere (1922)
 Watch Your Step (1922)
 The Love Letter (1923)

References

Bibliography
 Munden, Kenneth White. The American Film Institute Catalog of Motion Pictures Produced in the United States, Part 1. University of California Press, 1997.
 Reinhart, Mark S. Abraham Lincoln on Screen: Fictional and Documentary Portrayals on Film and Television. McFarland, 2009. 
 Solomon, Aubrey. The Fox Film Corporation, 1915-1935: A History and Filmography. McFarland, 2011.

External links

1860 births
1928 deaths
American stage actresses
American film actresses
Actresses from Cleveland